Udrycze-Kolonia  is a village in the administrative district of Gmina Stary Zamość, within Zamość County, Lublin Voivodeship, in eastern Poland.

References

Udrycze-Kolonia